Aleta Arthur Trauger (born December 9, 1945) is a United States district judge of the United States District Court for the Middle District of Tennessee.

Education and career

Born in Denver, Colorado, Trauger received a Bachelor of Arts degree from Cornell College in 1968, a Master of Arts in Teaching from Vanderbilt University in 1972, and a Juris Doctor from Vanderbilt University Law School in 1976. She was a clerk and associate in private practice in Tennessee from 1974 to 1977. She was an Assistant United States Attorney in the Middle District of Tennessee from 1977 to 1979 and from 1980 to 1982, serving in the Northern District of Illinois from 1979 to 1980. She was in private practice from 1983 to 1984, and was legal counsel to the College of Charleston from 1984 to 1985, returning to private practice from 1985 to 1991. She was a Chief of staff, Office of the Mayor, Nashville, Tennessee from 1991 to 1992. From 1993 to 1998, she was a United States Bankruptcy Judge for the Middle District of Tennessee.

Federal judicial service

On September 22, 1998, President Bill Clinton nominated Trauger to a seat on the United States District Court for the Middle District of Tennessee vacated by John Trice Nixon. She was confirmed by the United States Senate on October 21, 1998, and received her commission on October 22, 1998.

Notable cases

On March 14, 2014, Judge Trauger issued a preliminary injunction ordering Tennessee to recognize the marriages of three same-sex couples consummated out-of-state. In her ruling, Judge Trauger did not directly hold Tennessee's ban unconstitutional, but stated that, "At some point in the future, likely with the benefit of additional precedent from circuit courts and, perhaps, the Supreme Court, the court will be asked to make a final ruling on the plaintiffs’ claims. At this point, all signs indicate that, in the eyes of the United States Constitution, the plaintiffs’ marriages will be placed on an equal footing with those of heterosexual couples and that proscriptions against same-sex marriage will soon become a footnote in the annals of American history".

On February 22, 2016, Judge Trauger sentenced Matt DeHart — an American citizen and former U.S. Air National Guard intelligence analyst known for his involvement with the Anonymous hacker group and WikiLeaks and claims to have received classified documents alleging serious misconduct by the CIA — to 72 months for the porn charges and an additional 18 months for fleeing the country. Journalist Sarah Harrison called the sentencing, “another shameful milestone in the U.S. government’s war on digital activists.”

On March 23, 2017, Judge Trauger issued a preliminary injunction prohibiting Rutherford County from subjecting children to solitary confinement while their case proceeds.

On July 3, 2018, Judge Trauger struck down a law that would allow Tennessee officials to revoke driver's licenses of defendants who could not pay their court costs.

In September 2019, Trauger warned that a Tennessee law that restricted voter registration had "chilling effects" on individuals and organizations that were trying to register new voters in Tennessee. On September 12, Trauger struck down the law, ruling that there was no basis that the law would benefit Tennesseans. The law would have fined groups that pay workers when too many incomplete registration forms are submitted, and would have criminalized intentional infractions of a new set of rules with misdemeanor charges.

On July 9, 2021, Judge Trauger issued a preliminary injunction blocking a Tennessee law that would require businesses and other entities that allow transgender people to use the public restroom that matches their gender to post a government-prescribed warning sign. The lawsuit argues that the law violates the First Amendment rights of the businesses by forcing them to post notices that they disagree with and find offensive. The injunction blocks enforcement of the law while the lawsuit is pending, on the grounds that implementation would cause immediate and irreparable harm. In her opinion, Judge Trauger wrote, "The First Amendment holds its privileged place in our constitutional system because, 'whenever the Federal Government or a State prevents individuals from saying what they think on important matters or compels them to voice ideas with which they disagree, it undermines' both 'our democratic form of government' and the very 'search for truth' necessary for a thriving society to persist. Because that principle retains its vitality today, and because the law at issue in this case is a brazen violation of it, the court will grant the plaintiffs’ motion for a preliminary injunction."

References

Sources

1945 births
20th-century American judges
20th-century American women judges
21st-century American judges
21st-century American women judges
Assistant United States Attorneys
Judges of the United States bankruptcy courts
Judges of the United States District Court for the Middle District of Tennessee
Lawyers from Denver
Living people
United States district court judges appointed by Bill Clinton
Vanderbilt University Law School alumni